Moscow metro bombing may refer to:
 1977 Moscow bombings
 February 2004 Moscow Metro bombing
 August 2004 Moscow Metro bombing
 2010 Moscow Metro bombings